Julián Marin (born  in Reus, Spain), is a Spanish singer, songwriter and producer.

Career 
Marin started uploading covers to YouTube in 2010 until in 2014 the Spanish producer Mr.Rommel suggested that he release a single since he was known on Twitter.

During 2014 he was the radio presenter of the music section on the radio program "Me lo dices o me lo cuenta" on LaMasterFM radio in Madrid, and a year later, in 2015 he presented the music news on the Radio program "Entre la gente" in the radio of Madrid 10Radio.

The first single was entitled "dame tu calor" in 2016, a benefit single for the fight against cancer that managed to be in the TOP20 in the charts of iTunes of Spain the day of its release.

Thanks to this first single he has obtained three nominations: Artist revelation in EDM RADIO, candidate for the "imprescicible" awards of ReusTV and finally, best videoclip in the film festival in Zaragoza this 2016.

He is one of the candidates in the Eurocasting organized by RTVE to represent Spain in the Eurovision Song Contest 2017 in Kyiv.

Featured singles

References

Links 
 The new single of Julian Marin - ElFiesta.es http://www.elfiesta.es/index.php/noticias/77-dame-tu-calor-lo-nuevo-de-julian-marin
 The hit of Julian Marin - AbelAranaMedia http://abelaranamedia.blogspot.com.es/2016/06/temazos-de-verano-julian-marin-dame-tu.html
 Julian Marin tries his luck in music - serchtikiblog http://serchtiki.blogspot.com.es/2016/06/julian-marin-publica-su-primer-single.html
 "Dame tu calor" The song of the summer.- DavidCalvoBlog http://www.djdcg.com/2016/05/dametucalor-la-cancion-del-verano-que.html#links

Living people
People from Reus
21st-century Spanish singers
21st-century Spanish male singers
Year of birth missing (living people)